The 1980/81 NTFL season was the 60th season of the Northern Territory Football League (NTFL).

Nth. Darwin (Palmerston) have won their first ever Premiership title while defeating the Wanderers Eagles in the grand final by 6 points (1 goal).

Grand Final

References

Northern Territory Football League seasons
NTFL